Macrocheles matrius is a species of mite in the family Macrochelidae. It is found in New Zealand and Europe.

References

matrius
Articles created by Qbugbot
Animals described in 1925